Philippe Nabaa (born April 18, 1907 in Joun, Ottoman Empire – died on August 17, 1967 in Beirut, Lebanon) was Archeparch of the Melkite Greek Catholic Archeparchy of Beirut and Byblos.

Biography

On September 14, 1931 Philippe Nabaa was ordained at the age of 24 years as a priest. The appointment as Archbishop was on 17 September 1948 and on 3 October of the same year he was ordained a bishop. He was the successor of Maximos IV Sayegh and took in his role at the four sessions of the Second Vatican Council in part. From 1962 to 1967 he was Undersecretary in the Pontifical Commission for the interpretation of the decrees of the Second Vatican Council.

Philippe Nabaa was consecrator of the Archbishops Augustin Farah (Bishop of Tripoli and later Archbishop of Zahleh e Furzol of the Melkite Greek Catholic Church) and from his own successor Grégoire Haddad.

References

External links
 http://www.catholic-hierarchy.org/bishop/bnabaa.html
 http://www.gcatholic.org/dioceses/diocese/beir2.htm
 https://web.archive.org/web/20090315004748/http://www.pgc-lb.org/english/Church3.shtml

1907 births
1967 deaths
Melkite Greek Catholic bishops
People from Mount Lebanon Governorate